Psathyrella atrospora is a species of mushroom in the family Psathyrellaceae. Found in North America, it was described as new to science in 1972 by mycologist Alexander H. Smith.

References

External links

Psathyrellaceae
Fungi of North America
Fungi described in 1972